Bird Ridge is a partially ice-covered ridge  long, standing  northwest of Mount Storegutt, westward of Edward VIII Bay in Alaska. It was mapped from aerial photos taken by the Australian National Antarctic Research Expeditions in 1956, and named for Ian Georg Bird, a senior electronics technician at Mawson Station in 1961.

References 

Ridges of Enderby Land